7-a-side football at the 2019 Parapan American Games were held in Villa Maria del Triunfo Rugby field, Lima from August 24–31, 2019. There was 1 gold medals in this sport.

Squads

Format

The first round, or group stage, was a competition between the 6 teams in one group, where engaged in a round-robin tournament within itself. The best two teams play for gold in the finals, the third and fourth place for the third place in the tournament, the fifth and the sixth in the table are the fifth and the sixth of the tournament respectively.

Classification
Athletes with a physical disability competed. The athlete's disability was caused by a non-progressive brain damage that affects motor control, such as cerebral palsy, traumatic brain injury or stroke. Athletes must be ambulant.

Players were classified by level of disability.
C5: Athletes with difficulties when walking and running, but not in standing or when kicking the ball.
C6: Athletes with control and co-ordination problems of their upper limbs, especially when running.
C7: Athletes with hemiplegia.
C8: Athletes with minimal disability; must meet eligibility criteria and have an impairment that has impact on the sport of football.

Teams must field at least one class C5 or C6 player at all times. No more than two players of class C8 are permitted to play at the same time.

Group stage

Finals

Bronze medal match

Gold medal match

Statistics

Ranking

References

External links
 Football 7

2019 Parapan American Games